The Dark Matter Time Projection Chamber (DMTPC) is an experiment for direct detection of weakly interacting massive particles (WIMPs), one of the most favored candidates for dark matter. The experiment uses a low-pressure time projection chamber in order to extract the original direction of potential dark matter events. The collaboration includes physicists from the Massachusetts Institute of Technology (MIT), Boston University (BU), Brandeis University, and Royal Holloway University of London.  Several prototype detectors have been built and tested in laboratories at MIT and BU. The collaboration took its first data in an underground laboratory at the Waste Isolation Pilot Plant (WIPP) site near Carlsbad, New Mexico in Fall, 2010.

Detector Concept

The DMTPC detector consists of a TPC filled with low pressure CF4 gas.   Charged particles incident on the gas are slowed and eventually stopped, leaving a trail of free electrons and ionized molecules.  The electrons are drifted by an electric field toward an amplification region.  Instead of using MWPC endplates for amplification and event readout, as in the traditional TPC design, the DMTPC amplification region consists of a metal wire mesh separated from a copper anode with a high electric field between them.  This creates a more uniform electric field in order to preserve the shape of the original track during amplification.  The avalanche of electrons also creates a great deal of scintillation light, which passes through the wire mesh.  Some of this light is collected by a CCD camera located outside the main detector volume.  This results in a two dimensional image of the ionization signal of the track as it appeared on the amplification plane.  Information about the charged particle, including its direction of motion within the detector, can be reconstructed from the CCD readout.  Additional track information is obtained from readout of the charge signal on the anode plane.

The group has constructed and operated a number of detectors, such as the 10-L DMTPC (with 10 litres of volume) detector underground at Waste Isolation Pilot Plant in New Mexico, the 4Shooter or 4sh or FourShooter (with 20 litres of volume) detector above surface at MIT and the Canary chamber (with less than 1 litre of volume). All the detectors operated have been for prototype development purposes. There was a plan to move the 4Shooter detector to WIPP but an accident at the WIPP underground laboratory February 2014 cast doubt on this plan and it is not known whether the plan was actually enacted.

The largest existing prototype detectors each have a total of 20 L of CF4 gas within the drift region, where measurable events will occur.  The group also plans to eventually construct a detector with a volume of 1 m3 called DMTPC m3 (also called DMTPCino in some sources).

Detection of WIMPs
In a proposed dark matter event, a WIMP enters the detector volume and interacts with one of the atoms in the CF4, typically fluorine.  While the WIMP does not directly leave a track, the momentum transfer of the interaction causes the atom to recoil, and its ionization track, with a typical range of a few millimeters, may be detected.  CF4 gas is used because the most common fluorine isotope, 19F, is believed to be an excellent target nucleus for setting spin-dependent WIMP-nucleon scattering.  If the recoiling ion is energetic enough, the direction of the incoming WIMP may be extrapolated from the direction of the recoil.

Because of the motion of the solar system around the center of the galaxy, many physicists believe that the particles comprising the dark matter halo will appear to originate from a particular direction in the sky roughly corresponding to the position of the constellation Cygnus.  If this is true, the DMTPC group hope to be able to use the directional track information to statistically confirm the existence of dark matter, even in the presence of non-dark matter backgrounds which are believed to have a different directional signal.  Several other groups developing low pressure TPC dark matter detectors with directional sensitivity exist, including DRIFT, NEWAGE, and MIMAC.  Additionally, dark matter searches such as COUPP and NEWAGE also use fluorine as the principal target nucleus for spin-dependent interactions.

Results 

DMTPC published first results from a surface run in 2010, setting a spin-dependent cross section limit.

See also
Dark Matter
Weakly Interacting Massive Particle
Time Projection Chamber
DRIFT

References

Sources
 G. Jungman et al. "Supersymmetric Dark Matter". Physics Reports. 267 (1996) 195-373. doi:10.1016/0370-1573(95)00058-5
 J. D. Lewin and P. F. Smith. "Review of mathematics, numerical factors, and corrections for dark matter experiments based on elastic nuclear recoil". Astroparticle Physics. 6, 87 (1996). doi:10.1016/S0927-6505(96)00047-3
 S. Ahlen et al. (2009). "The case for a directional dark matter detector and the status of current experimental efforts". International Journal of Modern Physics A. doi:10.1142/S0217751X10048172. arXiv:0911.0323
 J. B. R. Battat et al. (2009). "DMTPC: A dark matter detector with directional sensitivity". arXiv:0907.0675v1.
 S. Ahlen  et al. (2010). "First Dark Matter Search Results from a Surface Run of the 10-L DMTPC Directional Dark Matter Detector". arXiv:1006.2928v2.

External links 
 DMTPC web portal
 MIT News article on DMTPC (and also the MiniCLEAN experiment)
 Blog entry from Scientific American about dark matter and DMTPC

Experiments for dark matter search